An artistic director may refer to someone who directs a musical ensemble, and in this medium, is often abbreviated as simply Director. The typical jobs of a musical artistic director are to choose repertoire for the ensemble, come up with an artistic vision for the group and also a long-term strategy for programming, and also to help choose performers if the ensemble is not pre-set. An artistic director may also be—and often is—the conductor of the ensemble and a "jack of all trades", performing multiple roles and even managing the ensemble, although that role is often left to a Managing Director if financial resources are available. A musical artistic director essentially mirrors a theatrical artistic director, albeit working in a different medium.

Occupations in music